The 1934–35 Western Kentucky State Teachers Hilltoppers men's basketball team represented Western Kentucky State Normal School and Teachers College (now known as Western Kentucky University) during the 1934-35 NCAA basketball season. The team was led by future Naismith Memorial Basketball Hall of Fame coach Edgar Diddle.  The Hilltoppers won the Kentucky Intercollegiate Athletic Conference championship and led NCAA in wins for the second consecutive season.  Harry Hardin, Brad Mutchler, and future Louisville Cardinals men's basketball coach, Bernard “Peck” Hickman were selected to the All-SIAA and All-KIAC teams.

Schedule

|-
!colspan=6| 1935 Kentucky Intercollegiate Athletic Conference Tournament

|-
!colspan=6| 1935 Southern Intercollegiate Athletic Association Tournament

References

Western Kentucky Hilltoppers basketball seasons
Western Kentucky State Teachers
Western Kentucky State Teachers
Western Kentucky State Teachers